Arbanitis is a genus of Australian armored trapdoor spiders that was first described by Ludwig Carl Christian Koch in 1874.

Species
 it contains sixty-one species:
A. andrewsi (Hogg, 1902) – Australia (South Australia)
A. baehrae (Wishart & Rowell, 2008) – Australia (New South Wales)
A. beaury Raven & Wishart, 2006 – Australia (New South Wales)
A. beni (Wishart, 2006) – Australia (New South Wales)
A. billsheari (Wishart & Rowell, 2008) – Australia (New South Wales)
A. biroi (Kulczyński, 1908) – Australia (New South Wales)
A. bithongabel (Raven & Wishart, 2006) – Australia (Queensland)
A. browningi (Wishart & Rowell, 2008) – Australia (New South Wales)
A. campbelli (Wishart & Rowell, 2008) – Australia (New South Wales)
A. cliffi (Wishart, 2006) – Australia (New South Wales)
A. crawfordorum (Wishart & Rowell, 2008) – Australia (New South Wales)
A. crispus (Karsch, 1878) – Australia (Tasmania)
A. davidwilsoni (Wishart & Rowell, 2008) – Australia (New South Wales)
A. dereki (Wishart, 1992) – Australia (New South Wales)
A. dougweiri (Wishart & Rowell, 2008) – Australia (New South Wales)
A. echo (Raven & Wishart, 2006) – Australia (Queensland, New South Wales)
A. elegans Rainbow & Pulleine, 1918 – Australia (New South Wales)
A. fredcoylei (Wishart & Rowell, 2008) – Australia (New South Wales)
A. gracilis Rainbow & Pulleine, 1918 – Australia (New South Wales), possibly New Guinea
A. grayi (Wishart & Rowell, 2008) – Australia (New South Wales)
A. gwennethae (Wishart, 2011) – Australia (New South Wales)
A. helensmithae (Wishart & Rowell, 2008) – Australia (New South Wales)
A. hirsutus Rainbow & Pulleine, 1918 – Australia (Queensland)
A. horsemanae (Wishart, 2011) – Australia (New South Wales)
A. kampenae (Wishart, 2011) – Australia (New South Wales)
A. kirstiae (Wishart, 1992) – Australia (New South Wales)
A. linklateri (Wishart & Rowell, 2008) – Australia (New South Wales)
A. longipes (L. Koch, 1873) (type) – Australia (Queensland, New South Wales)
A. lynabra (Wishart, 2006) – Australia (New South Wales)
A. macei (Wishart & Rowell, 2008) – Australia (New South Wales)
A. maculosus (Rainbow & Pulleine, 1918) – Australia (New South Wales)
A. mascordi (Wishart, 1992) – Australia (New South Wales)
A. maxhicksi (Wishart & Rowell, 2008) – Australia (New South Wales)
A. melancholicus (Rainbow & Pulleine, 1918) – Australia (New South Wales)
A. michaeli (Wishart, 2006) – Australia (New South Wales)
A. milledgei (Wishart & Rowell, 2008) – Australia (New South Wales)
A. montanus Rainbow & Pulleine, 1918 – Australia (New South Wales)
A. monteithi (Raven & Wishart, 2006) – Australia (Queensland)
A. mudfordae (Wishart & Rowell, 2008) – Australia (New South Wales)
A. ornatus (Rainbow, 1914) – Australia (Queensland)
A. papillosus (Rainbow & Pulleine, 1918) – Australia (Queensland)
A. paulaskewi (Wishart, 2011) – Australia (New South Wales)
A. phippsi (Wishart, 2011) – Australia (New South Wales)
A. rapax (Karsch, 1878) – Australia (New South Wales)
A. raveni (Wishart & Rowell, 2008) – Australia (New South Wales)
A. robertcollinsi Raven & Wishart, 2006 – Australia (Queensland)
A. robertsi (Main & Mascord, 1974) – Australia (New South Wales)
A. rodi (Wishart, 2006) – Australia (New South Wales)
A. rowelli (Wishart, 2011) – Australia (New South Wales)
A. shawi (Wishart, 2011) – Australia (New South Wales)
A. sydjordanae (Wishart & Rowell, 2008) – Australia (New South Wales)
A. taiti (Wishart & Rowell, 2008) – Australia (New South Wales)
A. tannerae (Wishart, 2011) – Australia (New South Wales)
A. tarnawskiae (Wishart & Rowell, 2008) – Australia (New South Wales)
A. thompsonae (Wishart & Rowell, 2008) – Australia (New South Wales)
A. trangae (Wishart, 2006) – Australia (New South Wales)
A. villosus (Rainbow, 1914) – Australia (New South Wales)
A. watsonorum (Wishart & Rowell, 2008) – Australia (New South Wales)
A. wayorum (Wishart, 2006) – Australia (New South Wales)
A. weigelorum (Wishart & Rowell, 2008) – Australia (New South Wales)
A. yorkmainae (Wishart & Rowell, 2008) – Australia (New South Wales)

See also
 List of common Australian spiders

References

Idiopidae
Mygalomorphae genera
Spiders of Australia
Taxa named by Ludwig Carl Christian Koch